Stephen Blake Woltz (born July 27, 1991), better known by his ring name "Hangman" Adam Page, is an American professional wrestler currently signed to All Elite Wrestling (AEW), where he is a former AEW World Champion and AEW World Tag Team Champion.

Woltz began his career in 2008, working on the independent circuit as Adam Page. In 2011, he began to appear in Ring of Honor (ROH), where he stayed for seven years. In 2016, Page joined the villainous stable Bullet Club, having a big push in the promotion. After he joined, he changed his gimmick to "Hangman" Adam Page, a cowboy-inspired character. Along with Bullet Club members The Young Bucks, Page won the ROH World Six-Man Tag Team Championship. Page also worked with the Japanese promotion New Japan Pro-Wrestling (NJPW), since ROH had an agreement with NJPW. In 2018, Bullet Club members Cody Rhodes and The Young Bucks left ROH and started their own promotion, All Elite Wrestling. Page also left ROH and signed with AEW. Page participated in a tournament to crown the first AEW World Champion, but was defeated in the finals against Chris Jericho. Months later, he won the AEW World Tag Team Championship with Kenny Omega; in 2021, he defeated Omega to win the AEW World Championship.

Early life
Stephen Woltz was born in the small community of Aaron's Creek in Halifax County, Virginia. He graduated from Halifax County High School in 2009.

Professional wrestling career

Independent circuit (2008–2018)
Woltz made his professional wrestling debut in 2008 under the ring name Adam Page. His first professional wrestling championship came when he teamed with Jason Blade to win the CWF Mid-Atlantic Tag Team Championship in January 2011. After losing the championship in August, Page won the CWF Mid-Atlantic Heavyweight Championship the following year, before losing it to Kamakazi Kid in May 2012. Throughout the following years, Page would win several championships for regional promotions around the United States. In September 2018, Page defeated Joey Janela in a Chicago Street Fight at independent wrestling pay-per-view event All In.

Ring of Honor (2011–2018)
Page made his ROH debut on January 14, 2011, at ROH Champions vs. All Stars in the dark match. In 2013, Page participated in the ROH Top Prospect Tournament, but was defeated on January 5 by Silas Young. Page made his pay-per-view debut at ROH's 11th Anniversary Show, where he participated in a Six Man Mayhem Match won by ACH. At Manhattan Mayhem, Page was defeated by Young in a singles match. At Death Before Dishonor XI, Page defeated RD Evans. At Glory by Honor XII, Page was defeated by Jimmy Jacobs. At Golden Dream, Page had his first title match, but he was defeated by the ROH World Television Champion Matt Taven. At Final Battle 2013, Page was defeated by Matt Hardy.

In 2014, Page feuded with The Decade, a stable formed by ROH veterans. At ROH's 12th Anniversary Show, The Decade (B. J. Whitmer, Jimmy Jacobs, and Roderick Strong) defeated Page, Cedric Alexander, and Mark Briscoe. On March 7, Page joined The Decade, as the first of the group's recruits, or "young boys". At Supercard of Honor VIII, Page, Jacobs, and Whitmer defeated Andrew Everett and Adrenaline Rush (A. C. H. and TaDarious Thomas). In October 2014, Page became a full-fledged member of The Decade, establishing himself as a heel in the process.

After Jacobs left the stable and Colby Corino joined, Page started a feud with ACH. At Best in the World, The Decade (Whitmer and Page) defeated ACH and Matt Sydal when Page pinned Sydal after a Rite of Passage. At Death Before Dishonor XIII, Page defeated ACH; however, Page subsequently left The Decade and feuded with BJ Whitmer, turning face in the process. Page faced Whitmer at ROH 14th Anniversary Show, but was defeated.

On May 9, 2016, during the first night of the War of the Worlds tour, Page became a villain once again when he joined Bullet Club by turning on Colt Cabana, The Briscoes, and The Motor City Machine Guns during a ten-man tag team main event. Page hanged Chris Sabin with a hangman's noose which gave Page his "Hangman" nickname. At Death Before Dishonor XIV Page defeated Jay Briscoe. On November 16, 2016, Page, was unsuccessful in winning the ROH World Television Championship where he was defeated by Bobby Fish. On April 1, 2017, Page teamed with Guerrillas of Destiny (Tama Tonga and Tanga Loa) as they were unsuccessful against Bully Ray and The Briscoes (Jay Briscoe and Mark Briscoe) for the ROH World Six-Man Tag Team Championship. Page got involved in a ROH World Television Championship match, helping Marty Scurll defeat Frankie Kazarian by hitting him with a chair. Kazarian and Page then battled in a strap match at Best in the World ending with Page submitting while being hanged via leather strap.

On August 20, 2017, Page won his first title in ROH, when he and his Bullet Club stablemates The Young Bucks (Matt Jackson and Nick Jackson), billed collectively as "The Hung Bucks", defeated Dalton Castle and The Boys for the ROH World Six-Man Tag Team Championship. While Page and The Young Bucks' Bullet Club stablemates Cody, Kenny Omega and Marty Scurll were later allowed to defend the title under "Bullet Club Rules", only Page and The Young Bucks were recognized as official champions. At ROH 16th Anniversary Show, The Hung Bucks lost the ROH World Six Man Tag Team Championships against SoCal Uncensored (Christopher Daniels, Frankie Kazarian and Scorpio Sky). Page fought Kota Ibushi at Supercard of Honor XII in a losing effort. Page began feuding with Punishment Martinez when Martinez attacked Page with a chair before a match. Page turned face once again when he attacked Martinez later on, putting him through a table; these two traded attacks until Page challenged Martinez for the ROH World Television Championship in a Baltimore Street Fight at Best in the World 2018 in a losing effort. Page entered ROH's International Cup tournament on the 2018 Honor Re-United Tour defeating Joe Hendry and Jimmy Havoc before losing to Mark Haskins in the finals. Page's final match in ROH was at Final Battle 2018 where Page was defeated by defending ROH World Television Champion Jeff Cobb. During the December 15 TV tapings, Page and The Elite left ROH.

New Japan Pro-Wrestling (2016–2019)

In June 2016, New Japan Pro-Wrestling (NJPW) announced Page would debut for the promotion at Dominion 6.19 in Osaka-jo Hall under the ring name Hangman Page in a six-man tag team match where he teamed up with Yujiro Takahashi and Bad Luck Fale to defeat Captain New Japan, Yoshi Tatsu, and Togi Makabe. Page scored the win after pinning Captain New Japan. Afterwards, Page also began using the name in ROH. On July 3, 2016, Page competed in a tag team match where he teamed up with Yujiro to defeat the team of Captain New Japan and Yoshi Tatsu at Kizuna Road 2016 event. On G1 Climax 26 Finals Page and Yujiro unsuccessfully challenged for IWGP Tag Team Championship against The Briscoe Brothers. From November 18 to December 10, 2016, Page and Yujiro participated in World Tag League 2016 where they finished second in A Block with record of four wins and three losses, thus failing to advance to the final. On July 1, 2017, at G1 Special in USA, Page took part in a tournament to determine the inaugural IWGP United States Heavyweight Champion, but was eliminated in his first round match by Jay Lethal. On August 13, Page and Bullet Club stablemate Cody unsuccessfully challenged War Machine (Hanson and Raymond Rowe) for the IWGP Tag Team Championship. From November 18 through December 11, Page once again teamed with Yujiro Takahashi (somewhat-jokingly now called "Dick and Balls") for World Tag League 2017. They placed third in A Block with 8 points.

At the New Beginning in Sapporo, after Jay White defeated Kenny Omega for the IWGP United States Championship, Page went to challenge White for the title, but was interrupted by Omega, after which Cody attacked Omega. Page challenged White for the IWGP United States Heavyweight Championship at Strong Style Evolved, but was defeated. Throughout Bullet Club's Civil War, Page was the only member fully supporting Cody and his coup to become leader. Page's first main event singles match in NJPW came against Kenny Omega at Wrestling Dontaku 2018 where he lost to Omega. At Dominion 2018, Page, along with Cody and Marty Scurll, defeated the trio of Jushin Thunder Liger, Hiroshi Tanahashi, and Rey Mysterio Jr.. Page and Scurll defeated Tanahashi and Kushida at the G1 Special in San Francisco. After Tama Tonga, Tonga Loa, and King Haku attacked Omega and the Young Bucks at the G1 Special in San Francisco, Page (along with Scurll, Chase Owens, Yujiro, and Cody) attempted to save The Elite only to be beaten down by the Tongans as well. Page participated in his first G1 Climax, G1 Climax 28, from July 14, 2018, through August 12, 2018. He placed second to last (ninth) in the A Block with 6 points. At King of Pro-Wrestling 2018 Page, along with Chase Owens and the Young Bucks, lost to the team of Bad Luck Fale, Tama Tonga, Tonga Loa and Taiji Ishimori. Page and Yujiro Takahashi (no longer as a tag-team) placed tenth in World Tag League 2018 with 10 points. Page's last appearance in NJPW was on the Wrestle Kingdom 13 pre-show where Page, Scurll and Takahashi were the first team eliminated from the NEVER Openweight 6-Man Tag Team Championship number one contender gauntlet match. After their elimination, an argument broke out between Page & Scurll, and Takahashi & Chase Owens leading to Owens and Takahashi leaving The Elite.

Pro Wrestling Guerrilla (2018)
In April 2018, Page made his debut for Pro Wrestling Guerrilla (PWG) at the first night of All-Star Weekend 14. Page fought then PWG World Champion, Keith Lee in a losing effort.

All Elite Wrestling

Member of The Elite (2019–2020)

In January 2019, Page signed with upstart promotion All Elite Wrestling (AEW), along with the rest of the Elite. Page was scheduled to face Pac at AEW's inaugural event Double or Nothing after a confrontation between the two at an AEW press conference, but the match was later cancelled due to "creative differences". Instead, Page was the surprise final entrant in the Casino Battle Royale at Double or Nothing, where he last eliminated MJF to win and get an AEW World Championship opportunity. However, at All Out on August 31, Page was defeated by Chris Jericho in a match to crown the inaugural AEW World Champion. On the premiere episode of Dynamite on October 2, Page was defeated by a returning Pac, but was able to emerge victorious over him in a rematch at Full Gear on November 9. Following this, Page began teaming alongside Kenny Omega, fellow member of the Elite. The two defeated SoCal Uncensored (Frankie Kazarian and Scorpio Sky) on the January 22, 2020 episode of Dynamite to win the AEW World Tag Team Championship, marking the first ever title change in AEW history. At Revolution on February 29, Page and Omega retained their title against The Young Bucks in a highly acclaimed match.

After this, the Elite began a feud with The Inner Circle (Chris Jericho, Jake Hager, Sammy Guevara, Santana and Ortiz), leading to the Elite recruiting the debuting Matt Hardy to oppose the group. At Double or Nothing on May 23, the Elite and Hardy defeated the Inner Circle in a Stadium Stampede match. After a lengthy period of tension within the group, Page was removed from the Elite by the Young Bucks on the August 27 episode of Dynamite, after he had stopped them from winning their match. On September 5 at All Out, Page and Omega lost the tag team championship to FTR (Cash Wheeler and Dax Harwood), ending their record-setting reign at 228 days. After losing the championship, Page and Omega separated as a team.

In September, Page was inserted into a tournament to determine the next challenger for the AEW World Championship. Page defeated Colt Cabana in the first round and Wardlow in the semi-finals to move on to the tournament finals against Omega, who defeated him at the Full Gear pay-per-view on November 7 to become number one contender.

AEW World Champion (2021–2022)
Going into 2021, Page began a storyline with The Dark Order (Evil Uno, Stu Grayson, Alex Reynolds and John Silver) where they tried to recruit him into their group. However, on the January 20, 2021 episode of Dynamite, Page rebuffed their offer and stated he would not join them, as he felt that he did not work well in groups. At the Revolution event on March 7, Page defeated Matt Hardy; the Dark Order subsequently came down to the ring to celebrate with him. At Double or Nothing on May 30, Page defeated Brian Cage.

At Road Rager, Page renewed his rivalry with his former allies Omega, who now held the AEW World Championship, and the Young Bucks, who were the AEW World Tag Team Champions. At Fight for the Fallen, Page teamed with the Dark Order to face Omega, the Young Bucks and the Good Brothers (Doc Gallows and Karl Anderson) in a 10-man tag team elimination match, where if Page and the Dark Order won, they would receive matches for the world and tag team championships, respectively. Page and the Dark Order were defeated, with Page being the last man eliminated on his team. At the Homecoming event on August 4, Omega and all his allies beat Page down, and Page would take paternity leave for the birth of his first child, a son. Page made his return at Dynamites Second Anniversary on October 6 as the surprise entrant in the seven-man Casino Ladder match. He won the match and secured himself a future shot for the AEW World Championship.

On November 13 at Full Gear, Page defeated Omega to win the world championship in a highly acclaimed match that received a 5  star rating from sports journalist Dave Meltzer, with Meltzer describing the match as a "classic". Page made his first defense of the championship against Bryan Danielson at the Winter Is Coming event on December 15, which ended in a 60-minute time limit draw; Page retained the championship, and received his second consecutive 5-star match from Meltzer. The two met in a rematch on the January 5, 2022 episode of Dynamite, which Page won. On the February 9 episode of Dynamite, Page successfully defended his title against Lance Archer in a Texas Deathmatch, and was afterwards confronted by Adam Cole, who indicated his intentions to challenge for the championship. On March 6, Page would defeat Cole at Revolution, despite interference from reDRagon (Bobby Fish and Kyle O'Reilly).
Page would defeat Cole once again in a Texas Deathmatch during an episode of Rampage. Shortly before the April 27 episode of Dynamite, Page tested positive for COVID-19, and was unable to confront CM Punk, who was announced as his opponent for Double or Nothing. At the event, Page lost the championship to Punk, thus ending his reign at 197 days.

Various feuds and injury (2022–present)
Page wrestled his first match since losing the AEW World Championship on the June 8 episode of Dynamite, defeating NJPW's David Finlay. After the match, Page would call out Kazuchika Okada, signalling his intentions to challenge for the IWGP World Heavyweight Championship at AEW×NJPW: Forbidden Door. Okada, however, would lose the championship to Jay White at Dominion 6.12 in Osaka-jo Hall, who would go on to insult Page in the post-match press conference. On the June 22 episode Dynamite, Page defeated Silas Young, and was attacked by Adam Cole and Jay White after the match, only to be saved by a debuting Okada. A four-way match for the IWGP World Heavyweight Championship between Page, Cole, White and Okada was made official for Forbidden Door where Page was unsuccessful after White pinned Cole to retain the title. On the October 18 episode of Dynamite: Title Tuesday, Page suffered a legitimate injury during a match with Jon Moxley for the AEW World Championship after landing off a lariat, causing a match stoppage.

Page made his return from injury on the November 30 edition of Dynamite, confronting Moxley before a brawl broke out between the two. After the two men were separated by security, the fight continued backstage.

Page defeated Moxley at AEW Revolution 2023 in a Texas Death Match.

Personal life
Woltz has been married to his wife Amanda since 2016. They have one child together, a boy, born in 2021.

He is a graduate of Virginia Tech, where he earned a bachelor's degree in communications in two years. Woltz was a full-time high school teacher, teaching journalism and graphic design, for five years while wrestling at the same time. He became a full-time wrestler in May 2016, with his first tour with New Japan Pro-Wrestling.

Championships and accomplishments

 All Elite Wrestling
 AEW World Championship (1 time)
 AEW World Tag Team Championship (1 time) – with Kenny Omega
 Men's Casino Battle Royale (2019)
 Men's Casino Ladder Match (2021)
 Dynamite Award (2 times)
 Bleacher Report PPV Moment of the Year (2021) – 
 Biggest Beatdown (2022) - 
 Carolina Wrestling Federation Mid-Atlantic
 CWF Mid-Atlantic Heavyweight Championship (1 time)
 CWF Mid-Atlantic Tag Team Championship (1 time) – with Jason Blade
Inside The Ropes Magazine
 Ranked No. 8 of the top 50 wrestlers in the world in the ITR 50 in 2020
 Premiere Wrestling Xperience
 PWX Tag Team Championship (2 times) – with Corey Hollis
 Pro Wrestling Illustrated
 Match of the Year (2020) 
 Ranked No. 4 of the top 500 singles wrestlers in the PWI 500 in 2022
 Ranked No. 2 of the top 50 Tag Teams in the PWI Tag Team 50 in 2020 
Pro Wrestling International
PWI International Trios Championship (2 times) - with Jason Blade and Jason Miller
 Ring of Honor
 ROH World Six-Man Tag Team Championship (1 time) – with Matt Jackson and Nick Jackson
 ROH Year-End Award (1 time)
 Breakout Star of the Year (2017)
 WrestleForce
 WrestleForce Tag Team Championship (1 time) – with Corey Hollis
 Wrestling Observer Newsletter
 Best Wrestling Maneuver (2021) 
 Feud of the Year (2021) 
 Most Improved (2018)
 Pro Wrestling Match of the Year (2020)

References

External links

 
 
 

1991 births
All Elite Wrestling personnel
American male professional wrestlers
Bullet Club members
Expatriate professional wrestlers in Japan
Living people
Professional wrestlers from Virginia
Schoolteachers from Virginia
Sportspeople from Virginia
Virginia Tech alumni
AEW World Tag Team Champions
AEW World Champions
People from Halifax County, Virginia
American expatriate sportspeople in Japan
21st-century professional wrestlers
ROH World Six-Man Tag Team Champions